Aghos Eleftherios, also known as Aghios Eleftherios on signage, is a metro station of the Athens Metro, Line 1, Patisia.

References

Athens Metro stations
Railway stations opened in 1961
1961 establishments in Greece